Sawall is a surname. Notable people with the surname include:

 Walter Sawall (1899–1953), German cyclist
 Willi Sawall (born 1941), Australian race walker